Elections of New York City's borough presidents were held on November 5, 1929, in concert with such contests as the mayoralty, Comptroller, aldermen, County Sheriffs, Aldermanic Board President, and other miscellaneous questions on the ballot. Democrats were elected in all Boroughs except Queens. This and Democratic victories in other contests were all a part of what was considered "a Crushing Defeat to [the] City G.O.P. [delivered]" by Tammany Hall.

Manhattan

Democratic incumbent Julius Miller defeated Republican challenger Fay.

References

Elections 1929
New York City borough president elections
New York City borough president elections
Borough president elections
New York City borough president elections